The 32nd Hundred Flowers Awards was a ceremony held on September 27, 2014 in Lanzhou, Gansu province. The nominees were announced on August 23.

Awards and nominations

Best Film

Best Director

Best Screenplay

Best Actor

Best Actress

Best Supporting Actor

Best Supporting Actress

References

External links
 The 32nd Hundred Flowers Awards Official Weibo

2014